This is a list of domestic and international destinations of Centralwings, a now defunct Polish airline:

Africa
Egypt
Hurghada (Hurghada International Airport)
Spain
Tenerife (Tenerife South Airport)

Europe
Bulgaria
Burgas (Burgas Airport)
Varna (Varna Airport)
Croatia
Dubrovnik (Dubrovnik Airport)
Czech Republic
Prague (Prague Ruzyně Airport)
France
Grenoble (Grenoble-Isère Airport)
Lille (Lille Airport)
Paris (Beauvais-Tillé Airport)
Germany
Cologne/Bonn (Cologne Bonn Airport)
Dortmund (Dortmund Airport)
Hamburg (Hamburg Airport)
Hanover (Hannover-Langenhagen Airport)
Nuremberg (Nuremberg Airport)
Greece
Athens (Athens International Airport)
Chania (Chania International Airport)
Corfu (Corfu International Airport)
Heraklion (Heraklion International Airport)
Kavala (Kavala International Airport)
Rhodes (Rhodes International Airport)
Thessaloniki (Thessaloniki International Airport)
Ireland
Cork (Cork Airport)
Dublin (Dublin Airport)
Shannon (Shannon Airport)
Italy
Bologna (Bologna Guglielmo Marconi Airport)
Catania (Catania-Fontanarossa Airport)
Lamezia Terme (Lamezia Terme Airport)
Milan (Malpensa Airport)
Palermo (Palermo Airport)
Rome
(Rome Ciampino Airport)
(Leonardo da Vinci-Fiumicino Airport)
Malta
Luqa (Malta International Airport)
Netherlands
Amsterdam (Amsterdam Airport Schiphol)
Norway
Haugesund (Haugesund Airport, Karmøy) 
Molde (Molde Airport, Årø)
Poland
Gdańsk (Gdańsk Lech Wałęsa Airport)
Katowice (Katowice International Airport)
Kraków (John Paul II International Airport Kraków-Balice)
Łódź (Łódź Władysław Reymont Airport)
Poznań (Poznań-Ławica Airport)
Szczecin (Szczecin-Goleniów "Solidarność" Airport)
Warsaw (Warsaw Chopin Airport)
Wrocław (Copernicus Airport Wrocław)
Portugal
Faro (Faro Airport)
Lisbon (Lisbon Portela Airport)
Spain
Barcelona (Barcelona El Prat Airport)
Girona (Girona-Costa Brava Airport)
Málaga (Málaga Airport)
Palma de Mallorca (Palma de Mallorca Airport)
United Kingdom
Birmingham (Birmingham Airport)
Edinburgh (Edinburgh Airport)
Leeds/Bradford (Leeds Bradford International Airport)
London
(Gatwick Airport)
(London Stansted Airport)
Manchester (Manchester Airport)

Middle East
Israel
Tel Aviv (Ben Gurion International Airport)

Lists of airline destinations
LOT Polish Airlines